Carlos Manuel Sampaio Nascimento (born 12 October 1994) is a Portuguese sprinter. He competed in the 60 metres at the 2016 IAAF World Indoor Championships.

Competition record

1Did not start in the final

Personal bests
Outdoor
100 metres – 10.13 (+1.0 m/s, Braga 2018)
200 metres – 21.05 (+0.0 m/s, Braga 2018)
Indoor
60 metres – 6.62 (Toruń 2021) 
200 metres – 21.25 (Pombal 2018)

References

External links
 

1994 births
Living people
Portuguese male sprinters
Sportspeople from Matosinhos
Athletes (track and field) at the 2010 Summer Youth Olympics
Athletes (track and field) at the 2019 European Games
European Games medalists in athletics
European Games gold medalists for Portugal
Competitors at the 2019 Summer Universiade
Athletes (track and field) at the 2020 Summer Olympics
Olympic athletes of Portugal